Taksi is a 1990 Indonesian drama film directed by Arifin C Noer. The film won eight awards at the Indonesian Film Festival in 1990. It was the highest-grossing film of 1990–91 in Indonesia. A sequel, Taksi Juga, was released the next year.

Accolades

References 

Citra Award winners
1990s Indonesian-language films
1990 films
1990 drama films
Indonesian drama films